Richard S. Burgess (14 February 1829 – 5 October 1866) was a notorious murderer known for the "Maungatapu murders" which occurred on the Maungatapu track, south-east of Nelson, New Zealand.

Born Richard Hill in west London in 1829, reputedly the illegitimate son of a guards officer and a lady's companion, he became involved in petty street crime at age 14 and was soon jailed and flogged for pickpocketing. Two years later he was sentenced to 15 years' transportation for burglary. After 20 months of solitary confinement he was shipped to Melbourne, Australia, arriving in September 1847.

In 1852, he was sentenced to 10 years of imprisonment for armed highway robbery, and he was released in October 1861. He was calling himself Burgess, the name of a New South Wales runholder he had attempted to steal from. He left Australia in January 1862 for New Zealand and the Central Otago Gold Rush. On 12 June 1866, James Battle was murdered on the Maungatapu track by Burgess and four others, known as the 'Burgess gang'. The following day four other men were killed nearby. In court Burgess boasted of committing nine murders; he wrote his memoirs while awaiting trial. He was executed in Nelson Gaol at around 8:30 a.m. on 5 October 1866.

References 

1829 births
1866 deaths
1866 murders in New Zealand
19th-century executions by New Zealand
Convicts transported to Australia
English people convicted of murder
Executed mass murderers
Executed New Zealand people
Executed people from London
New Zealand mass murderers
New Zealand outlaws
People convicted of murder by New Zealand
People executed by New Zealand by hanging
People executed for murder
Suspected serial killers